The 2019 Austin Peay Governors football team represents Austin Peay State University during the 2019 NCAA Division I FCS football season. The Governors, led by first-year head coach Mark Hudspeth, play their home games at Fortera Stadium as members of the Ohio Valley Conference.

Previous season

The Governors finished the 2018 season 5–6, 3–5 in OVC play to finish in a tie for sixth place.

Preseason

Preseason coaches' poll
The OVC released their preseason coaches' poll on July 22, 2019. The Governors were picked to finish in fourth place.

Preseason All-OVC team
The Governors had two players at two positions selected to the preseason all-OVC team.

Offense

Kentel Williams – RB

Kyle Anderton – OT

Coaching Staff
 Head Coach - Mark Hudspeth
 Associate Head Coach/Defensive Line Coach - Marquase Lovings
 Offensive Coordinator/Quarterbacks Coach - Tim Zetts
 Defensive Coordinator/Linebackers Coach - Mark Powell
 Co-Defensive Coordinator/Secondary Coach - Dominique Brown
 Wide Receivers Coach - Chad Bumphis
 Running Backs Coach - Craig Candeto
 Offensive Line Coach - Eddy Morrissey
 Nickels Coach - Keith Scott
 Assistant Defensive Line Coach - Kevon Beckwith

Schedule

Source:

Game summaries

North Carolina Central

Central Arkansas

at Mercer

at East Tennessee State

Jacksonville State

Southeast Missouri State

at Tennessee State

at Tennessee Tech

at Eastern Kentucky

UT Martin

at Murray State

Eastern Illinois

FCS Playoffs
The Governors, even though the team shared the OVC title, APSU held the tiebreaker due to defeating SEMO in the regular season therefore receiving the automatic bid for the postseason tournament, with a first-round pairing against Furman.

Furman–First Round

at Sacramento State–Second Round

at Montana State–Quarterfinals

Media Affiliates

Radio
 ESPN Radio Clarksville 104.1 and 540 AM

TV
 OVC on ESPN+

References

Austin Peay
Austin Peay Governors football seasons
Ohio Valley Conference football champion seasons
Austin Peay
Austin Peay Governors football